1984 (stylized in Roman numerals as MCMLXXXIV) is the sixth studio album by American rock band Van Halen, released on January 9, 1984. It was the last Van Halen studio album until A Different Kind of Truth (2012) to feature lead singer David Lee Roth, who left the band in 1985 following creative differences. This is the final full-length album to feature all four original members (Van Halen brothers, Roth, and Michael Anthony), although they reunited briefly in 2000 to start work on what would much later become 2012's A Different Kind of Truth. Roth returned in 2007, but Eddie's son Wolfgang replaced Anthony in 2006. 1984 and Van Halen's debut are Van Halen's bestselling albums, each having sold more than 10 million copies.

1984 was well received by music critics. Rolling Stone ranked the album number 81 on its list of the 100 Greatest Albums of the 1980s. It reached number two on the Billboard 200 album chart and remained there for five weeks, behind Michael Jackson's Thriller, on which guitarist Eddie Van Halen made a guest performance. 1984 produced four singles, including "Jump", Van Halen's only number-one single on the Billboard Hot 100; the top-20 hits "Panama" and "I'll Wait"; and the MTV favorite "Hot for Teacher". The album was certified diamond by the Recording Industry Association of America in 1999, signifying ten million shipped copies.

Background and recording

Following the tour in support of their fourth studio album, Fair Warning, the band initially wanted to slow down and take a break. They released just one single, "(Oh) Pretty Woman"/"Happy Trails", intended to be a stand-alone release. However, the band's label asked for another album due to the A-side's success and the band recorded their fifth studio album, Diver Down, very quickly. Following the recording of the album, guitarist Eddie Van Halen was dissatisfied by the concessions he had made to Van Halen frontman David Lee Roth and Warner Bros. producer Ted Templeman. Both discouraged Eddie from making keyboards a prominent instrument in the band's music.

By 1983, Eddie was in the process of building his own studio, naming it 5150 after the California law code for the temporary, involuntary psychiatric commitment of individuals (who present a danger to themselves or others due to signs of mental illness), with Donn Landee, the band's longtime engineer (and later, producer on the 5150 and OU812 recordings). While boards and tape machines were being installed, Eddie began working on synthesizers to pass the time. "There were no presets," said Templeman. "He would just twist off until it sounded right." There, he composed Van Halen's follow-up to Diver Down without as much perceived "interference" from Roth or Templeman. The result was a compromise between the two creative factions in the band: a mixture of keyboard-heavy songs, and the guitar-driven hard rock for which the band was known. 1984 was the longest-in-the-making album of the band's career to date, taking months to record, compared to most of their previous LPs taking less than two weeks, while their first LP was recorded in just 5 days, all at Sunset Studios.

In Rolling Stone'''s retrospective review of 1984 in its '100 Best Albums of the Eighties' list, Templeman said, "It's real obvious to me [why 1984 won Van Halen a broader and larger audience]. Eddie Van Halen discovered the synthesizer."

Artwork
The album cover was art directed by Richard Seireeni and Pete Angelus, and the cover art was painted by graphic artist Margo Nahas. Seireeni, then Creative Director at Warner Bros. Records, had collected a number of artist portfolios for the band to review. Among those was the work of Margo Nahas. Nahas had initially been asked to create a cover that featured four chrome women dancing, but declined due to the creative difficulties. The band reviewed her work once again, and from her previously created material they chose the painting of a putto stealing cigarettes that was used. The model was Carter Helm, who was the child of one of Nahas' best friends, whom she photographed holding a candy cigarette. The front cover was censored in the UK at the time of the album's release. It featured a sticker that obscured the cigarette in the putto's hand and the pack of cigarettes. The back cover features all four band members individually with 1984 in a green futuristic typeface.

Composition
Musically, 1984 has been described as glam metal, hard rock, heavy metal, synth rock, and pop rock. The album's first two singles, "Jump" and "I'll Wait", feature prominent synthesizers, as does the album's intro track, "1984", a one-minute instrumental. Eddie Van Halen played an Oberheim OB-Xa synthesizer on the album except for “I’ll Wait” which was recorded with the newer Oberheim OB-8. The reason for this is that Ed's OB-Xa was having an issue staying in tune and while it was being repaired he was sent the newer model OB-8 (which was featured prominently on future Van Halen albums).

Eddie Van Halen stated he wrote the arrangement for "Jump" several years before 1984 was recorded. In a 1995 cover story in Rolling Stone, the guitarist said Roth had rejected the synth riff for "Jump" for at least two years before agreeing to write lyrics to it. In his memoir Crazy from the Heat, Roth confirms Eddie's account, admitting a preference for Van Halen's guitar work; however, he says he now enjoys the song. Additionally in his memoir, Roth writes that he wrote the lyrics to "Jump" after watching a man waffle as to whether to commit suicide by jumping off a skyscraper.

The album's third single was "Panama", which features a heavy guitar riff reminiscent of Van Halen's earlier work. The engine noise was from Eddie revving up his Lamborghini, with microphones used near the tailpipes.classicvanhalen.com - 1984 Later, a video of "Hot for Teacher" was released and played regularly on MTV, giving the band a fourth hit which sustained sales of the album.

Other songs on 1984 included "Girl Gone Bad", parts of which previously had been played during the 1982 tour amidst performances of "Somebody Get Me a Doctor" (including the US Festival show), the hard rock "Drop Dead Legs", and "Top Jimmy", a tribute to James Paul Koncek of the band Top Jimmy & The Rhythm Pigs. The album concludes with "House of Pain", a heavy metal song that dates back to the band's early club days of the mid-1970s.

Eddie Van Halen told an interviewer that "Girl Gone Bad" was written in a hotel room that he and then-wife Valerie Bertinelli had rented. Bertinelli was asleep, and Van Halen woke up during the night with an idea he had to put on tape. Not wanting to wake Bertinelli, Van Halen grabbed a cassette recorder and recorded himself playing guitar in the closet.

Release1984 peaked at number 2 on the Billboard album charts (behind Michael Jackson's Thriller, which featured an Eddie Van Halen guitar solo on "Beat It"), and remained there for 5 straight weeks. It contained the anthems "Jump", "Panama", "I'll Wait", and "Hot for Teacher". "Jump" reached number 1 on the Billboard Hot 100. 1984 is the second of two Van Halen albums to have achieved RIAA Diamond status, selling over ten million copies in the United States. Their debut Van Halen was the first. "Jump" went on to be certified Gold in April 1984, only months after the album's release.

The album's follow-up singles – the synth-driven "I'll Wait", and "Panama", each peaked at Billboard number 13 on the Pop charts, respectively, in March and June. "Hot for Teacher" was a moderate Billboard Hot 100 success, reaching number 56; the MTV video for "Hot for Teacher" became even more popular. The "Hot for Teacher" video, which was directed by Roth, stars preteen lookalikes of the four Van Halen band members; a stereotypical nerd named "Waldo"; David Lee Roth as Waldo's bus driver; and numerous teachers stripping.

To promote the album, the band ran a contest on MTV. The contest was called, "Lost Weekend" with Van Halen. Fans mailed over 1 million postcards to MTV in hopes of winning the contest. In the promo for MTV, David Lee Roth said, "You won't know where you are, you won't know what's going to happen, and when you come back, you're not gonna have any memory of it." Kurt Jeffries won the contest and was flown to Detroit to join the band. Jeffries was allowed to bring along his best friend. He was given a Lost Weekend T-shirt and a hat. He was also brought on stage and had a large sheet cake smashed in his face which was followed by about a dozen people pouring champagne on him.

Songwriting credits
Like many bands starting out on their career, Van Halen shared songwriting credit equally between all members (including guitar instrumentals), and this album was no exception, but subsequent claims would lend credibility to the view that all songs were entirely or predominantly written by Eddie Van Halen and David Lee Roth, with little input from Van Halen's rhythm section.

The UK single release for "I'll Wait" credited Michael McDonald as a co-writer, but he was not credited on the US version. The ASCAP entry for "I'll Wait" lists Michael McDonald as co-writer with Roth and the Van Halens.

After the release of Best Of – Volume I (1996), Van Halen renegotiated their royalties with their label Warner Bros. In 2004, Roth discovered that the rest of the band had renegotiated a royalty rate five times greater than his for releases made during his time as lead singer.

Songs from 1984 that appear on compilations after the royalty renegotiation and Roth's lawsuit were credited to Edward Van Halen, Alex Van Halen, and David Lee Roth, with Michael Anthony's name removed from the credits, as evident in the end song credits of the 2007 film Superbad.

Michael Anthony's longstanding bass technician Kevin Dugan has noted that the opening title track instrumental from the album originates from a Roland bass synthesizer passage created as an intro for Anthony's in-concert bass solos, and has claimed that he and Anthony wrote and programmed it together.

Critical reception

Reviews for 1984 were generally favorable. Robert Christgau rated the album a B+. He explained that "Side one is pure 'up', and not only that, it sticks to the ears" and that "Van Halen's pop move avoids fluff because they're heavy, and schlock because they're built for speed, finally creating an all-purpose mise-en-scene for Brother Eddie's hair-raising, stomach-churning chops." He also called side two "consolation for their loyal fans—a little sexism, a lot of pyrotechnics, and a standard HM bass attack on something called 'House of Pain'." J.D. Considine, a reviewer for Rolling Stone, rated 1984 four out of five stars. He called it "the album that brings all of Van Halen's talent into focus." He stated that ""Jump" is not exactly the kind of song you'd expect from Van Halen", but that "once Alex Van Halen's drums kick in and singer David Lee Roth starts to unravel a typically convoluted story line, things start sounding a little more familiar". Although he mentioned "Jump" as having "suspended chords and a pedalpoint bass in a manner more suited to Asia", he went on to state that "Eddie Van Halen manages to expand his repertoire of hot licks, growls, screams and seemingly impossible runs to wilder frontiers than you could have imagined." He concluded that "what really makes this record work is the fact that Van Halen uses all this flash as a means to an end—driving the melody home—rather than as an end in itself" and that "despite all the bluster, Van Halen is one of the smartest, toughest bands in rock & roll. Believe me, that's no newspeak."

In a 1984 review, Billboard states the album is "funnier and more versatile than most of their metal brethren", calling the production "typically strong". A retrospective review by AllMusic's Stephen Thomas Erlewine was extremely positive. He noted that the album caused "a hoopla that was a bit of a red herring since the band had been layering in synths since their third album, Women and Children First". He further stated that "Jump"'s "synths played a circular riff that wouldn't have sounded as overpowering on guitar", but that "the band didn't dispense with their signature monolithic, pulsating rock." He also stated that "where [previous] albums placed an emphasis on the band's attack, this places an emphasis on the songs."Guitar Player magazine writer Matt Blackett praises the "deeper cuts" of the album, "Drop Dead Legs", "House of Pain", and "Girl Gone Bad", calling the guitar work "fresh and vital", noting Eddie's "dark, complex sense of harmony and melody". Len Comaratta from Consequence of Sound felt Van Halen reached the pinnacle of its commercial and critical success. At the end of the 1980s, Rolling Stone, which had previously been critical of Van Halen, ranked 1984 at number 81 on its list of the 100 Greatest Albums of the 1980s. The album was also included in the book 1001 Albums You Must Hear Before You Die. Guitar World magazine placed the album on their list of "New Sensations: 50 Iconic Albums That Defined 1984".

Following the death of lead guitarist Eddie Van Halen in October 2020, 1984 saw a brief resurgence to the charts.

Track listing

Tracks recorded for the album that remain unreleased or were renamed are according to a Warner Bros. memo from August 24, 1983: "Baritone Slide", "Lie to You", "Ripley", "Any Time, Any Place", "Forget It", "5150 Special", and "Anything to Make It Right (synth)". A September 7, 1983 memo adds an 8th title that didn't make the album, "Won't Let Go (needs lyrics)" while dropping "Lie To You" and "5150 Special". "Ripley" is confirmed to have become "Blood and Fire" on the A Different Kind of Truth album and as "I'll Wait", "Top Jimmy", "Drop Dead Legs" and "Girl Gone Bad" are not mentioned on either memo the titles may have changed, leaving at least four unreleased tracks from the 1984 sessions.

Personnel

Van Halen
 David Lee Roth – vocals
 Eddie Van Halen – guitars, keyboards, background vocals
 Michael Anthony – bass guitar, synth bass on "I'll Wait", background vocals
 Alex Van Halen – drums

Production
 Pete Angelus – art direction
 Chris Bellman – mastering
 Ken Deane – engineering
 Gregg Geller – mastering
 Donn Landee – engineering
 Jo Motta – project coordination
 Margo Nahas – cover art
 Joan Parker – production coordination
 Richard Seireeni – art direction
 Ted Templeman – production

Charts

Weekly charts

Year-end charts

Certifications

See also
 "Coma Guy", an episode of Family Guy'' where Peter Griffin's life is transformed by borrowing the album from the library

References

Further reading
 

Van Halen albums
1984 albums
Warner Records albums
Albums produced by Ted Templeman
Albums recorded in a home studio